Wila Pukara (Aymara wila blood, blood red, pukara fortress, "red fortress", also spelled Wila Pucara) is a   mountain in the Bolivian Andes. It is situated in the La Paz Department, Loayza Province, in the north of the Yaco Municipality.

References 

Mountains of La Paz Department (Bolivia)